The RCA Albums Collection may refer to:

The RCA Albums Collection (Harry Nilsson box set)
The RCA Albums Collection (Elvis Presley box set)